Greg Lakin is an American politician who served in the Kansas House of Representatives as a Republican for one year, from January of 2017 to January 8, 2018. 

A physician, Lakin worked as the medical director of a private clinic when he was elected to the state legislature in the 2016 elections. He won the Republican primary election, 64% to 36%, and faced no opposition in the general election. A year after he took office, Lakin resigned his seat after he was appointed by Kansas Governor Sam Brownback as Chief Medical Officer of the Kansas Department of Health and Environment. Local Republican officials chose Emil Bergquist to replace him.

References

Living people
Year of birth missing (living people)
Place of birth missing (living people)
Republican Party members of the Kansas House of Representatives
21st-century American politicians
Politicians from Wichita, Kansas
21st-century American physicians
Physicians from Kansas